Franco Zurlo (4 October 1940 – 17 June 2018) was an Italian boxer. He competed in the men's bantamweight event at the 1964 Summer Olympics. At the 1964 Summer Olympics he defeated Mikhail Mitsev of Bulgaria in the Round of 32, before losing to Oleg Grigoryev of the Soviet Union in the Round of 16.

References

External links
 

1940 births
2018 deaths
Italian male boxers
Olympic boxers of Italy
Boxers at the 1964 Summer Olympics
People from Brindisi
Bantamweight boxers
Sportspeople from the Province of Brindisi